The 2012–13 season is Kitchee SC's 82nd season in football, and the 34th season in the Hong Kong First Division League. Kitchee started as defending champions having won the league, as well as the Hong Kong FA Cup in 2011–12, and was looking to retain their title. The club also played in the AFC Cup for the third time.

Key events
 29 May 2012: Spanish forward Jonathan Carril joins Kitchee for an undisclosed fee from CF Palencia.
 31 May 2012: General manager Ken Ng announced that Hong Kong forward Cheng Siu Wai joins Kitchee for an undisclosed fee from Sunray Cave JC Sun Hei, while Tsang Chi Hau, Tsang Kin Fong and Li Ngai Hoi return after a loan spell in Hong Kong Sapling for a season.
 7 July 2012: General manager Ken Ng announced that Tsang Kin Fong and Ngan Lok Fung are loaned out to Sunray Cave JC Sun Hei and Sun Pegasus respectively.
 30 July 2012: Kitchee played out a 2–2 draw with English Premier League team Arsenal at the Hong Kong Stadium. The match also saw off Roberto Losada, who retired from playing football and will be the assistant coach of Kitchee after the match.
 7 January 2013: Hong Kong international left back Cheung Kin Fung signed a 6-month loan contract from Sunray Cave JC Sun Hei. At the same time, James Ha and Liang Zicheng are loaned to them until the end of the season.
 31 January 2013: 3 youth team players, Chan Ka Ho, So Chun Yin and Wong Tsz Chun are promoted to the first team.
 27 February 2013: Canadian midfielder Matt Lam joins the club as a free transfer. He signed an 18-month contract with the club. He is registered as a local player as he holds a HKID card.
 11 May 2013: The club win their first title of the season as they defeated Sun Pegasus 1–0 in the final to claim the champions of FA Cup title.
 14 May 2013: The club reached the AFC Cup quarter-finals for the first time in club history after beating Malaysia Super League side Kelantan FA 2–0.

Players

First team
As of 27 February 2013.

Remarks:
NP These players are registered as foreign players.

Out on loan

Transfers

In

Out

Loan in

Loan out

Stats

Squad stats

Top scorers
As of 26 May 2013

Disciplinary record
As of 26 May 2013

Competitions

Overall

1 Kitchee will continue their 2013 AFC Cup matches in the following season.

First Division League

Classification

Results summary

Results by round

Matches

Pre-season

Competitive

First Division League

Remarks:
1 Biu Chun Rangers's home matches against Kitchee are played at Mong Kok Stadium instead of their usual home ground Sham Shui Po Sports Ground.
2 The capacity of Aberdeen Sports Ground is originally 9,000, but only the 4,000-seated main stand is opened for football match.
3 Home match against Sunray Cave JC Sun Hei was originally scheduled to be played on 31 March 2013 but was rescheduled to be played on 29 March 2013.
4 Since the 3,500-seated main stand was all full, the 1,500 temporary stand was opened and therefore the capacity of Tseung Kwan O Sports Ground was 5,000 in the home match against South China.

Senior Challenge Shield

Quarterfinals

FA Cup

Quarter-finals

Semi-finals

Final

Hong Kong AFC Cup play-offs

AFC Cup

Group stage

Round of 16

Other competitions

Hong Kong–Shanghai Inter Club Championship

Notes

References

Kitchee SC seasons
Kit